Qasimabad or Qasemabad or Qasem Abad may refer to:

Iran

Alborz Province
Qasemabad-e Aqa, village in Savojbolagh County, Alborz Province, Iran
Qasemabad-e Bozorg, village in Savojbolagh County, Alborz Province, Iran
Qasemabad-e Gorji, village in Nazarabad County, Alborz Province, Iran
Qasemabad-e Kuchek, village in Nazarabad County, Alborz Province, Iran

Ardabil Province
Qasemabad, Ardabil, a village in Parsabad County

Chaharmahal and Bakhtiari Province
Qasemabad, Chaharmahal and Bakhtiari, a village in Kuhrang County

Fars Province
Qasemabad, Bagh Safa, a village in Bavanat County
Qasemabad, Tujerdi, a village in Bavanat County
Qasemabad-e Bikheh Deraz, a village in Fasa County
Qasemabad-e Olya, Fars, a village in Fasa County
Qasemabad-e Sofla, Fars, a village in Fasa County
Qasemabad, Marvdasht, a village in Marvdasht County
Qasemabad, Naqsh-e Rostam, a village in Marvdasht County
Qasemabad, Neyriz, a village in Neyriz County
Qasemabad, Sepidan, a village in Sepidan County

Gilan Province
Qasemabad-e Olya, Gilan, a village in Rudsar County
Qasemabad-e Sofla, Gilan, a village in Rudsar County
Pain Mahalleh-ye Qasemabad, a village in Rudsar County

Golestan Province
Qasemabad-e Yolmeh Salian, a village in Aqqala County

Hamadan Province
Qasemabad, Asadabad, a village in Asadabad County, Hamadan Province, Iran
Qasemabad-e Laklak, a village in Asadabad County, Hamadan Province, Iran
Qasemabad, Hamadan, a village in Hamadan County, Hamadan Province, Iran
Qasemabad, Tuyserkan, a village in Tuyserkan County, Hamadan Province, Iran

Hormozgan Province
Qasemabad, Hormozgan, a village in Parsian County, Hormozgan Province, Iran

Ilam Province
Qasemabad, Ilam, a village in Shirvan and Chardaval County, Ilam Province, Iran

Isfahan Province
 Qasemabad, Aran va Bidgol, a village in Aran va Bidgol County
 Qasemabad, Shahin Shahr and Meymeh, a village in Shahin Shahr and Meymeh County
 Qasemabad, Tiran and Karvan, a village in Tiran and Karvan County

Kerman Province
 Qasemabad, Anbarabad, a village in Anbarabad County
 Qasemabad, Hoseynabad, a village in Anbarabad County
 Qasemabad, Narmashir, a village in Narmashir County
 Qasemabad, Rafsanjan, a village in Rafsanjan County
 Qasemabad, Koshkuiyeh, a village in Rafsanjan County
 Qasemabad-e Deh Panah, a village in Rafsanjan County
 Qasemabad Rural District, in Rafsanjan County
 Qasemabad-e Pir Almas, a village in Rigan County
 Qasemabad, Rudbar-e Jonubi, a village Rudbar-e Jonubi County
 Qasemabad, Sirjan, a village in Sirjan County

Kermanshah Province
Qasemabad, Gilan-e Gharb, a village in Gilan-e Gharb County
Qasemabad, Qazvineh, a village in Kangavar County

Khuzestan Province
Qasemabad, Andika, a village in Andika County
Qasemabad, Masjed Soleyman, a village in Masjed Soleyman County

Kohgiluyeh and Boyer-Ahmad Province
Qasemabad-e Jalil, a village in Boyer-Ahmad County

Kurdistan Province
Qasemabad, Bijar, a village in Bijar County
Qasemabad, Kurdistan,a  village in Qorveh County

Lorestan Province
Qasimabad, alternate name of Tian, Azna, a village in Azna County
Qasemabad-e Cheshmeh Barqi, village in Selseleh County
Qasemabad, Aligudarz, village in Aligudarz County
Qasemabad, Khorramabad, village in Khorramabad County

Markazi Province
Qasemabad, Arak, village in Arak County, Markazi Province, Iran
Qasemabad, Khomeyn, village in Khomeyn County, Markazi Province, Iran
Qasemabad, Tafresh, village in Tafresh County, Markazi Province, Iran
Qasemabad-e Olya, village in Zarandieh County, Markazi Province, Iran
Qasemabad-e Sofla, Markazi, village in Zarandieh County, Markazi Province, Iran

Mazandaran Province
Qasemabad, Mazandaran, a village in Nur County, Mazandaran Province, Iran

North Khorasan Province
Qasemabad, North Khorasan, village in Esfarayen County, North Khorasan Province, Iran

Qazvin Province
Qasemabad, Qazvin (disambiguation), villages in Qazvin County, Qazvin Province, Iran
Qasemabad, Takestan, village in Takestan County, Qazvin Province, Iran
Qasemabad, Khorramdasht, village in Takestan County, Qazvin Province, Iran

Razavi Khorasan Province
Qasemabad, Bajestan, a village in Bajestan County
Qasemabad, Bardaskan, a village in Bardaskan County
Qasemabad, Fariman, a village in Fariman County
Qasemabad, Khaf, a city in Khvaf County
Qasemabad, Mashhad, a village in Mashhad County
Qasemabad, Piveh Zhan, a village in Mashhad County
Qasemabad, Razaviyeh, a village in Mashhad County
Qasemabad, Tus, a village in Mashhad County
Qasemabad, Nishapur, a village in Nishapur County
Qasemabad, Miyan Jolgeh, a village in Nishapur County
Qasemabad, Quchan, a village in Quchan County
Qasemabad, Sarakhs, a village in Sarakhs County
Qasemabad, Torbat-e Jam, a village in Torbat-e Jam County

Semnan Province
Qasemabad, Damghan, a village in Damghan County
Qasemabad-e Khanlar Khan, a village in Shahrud County

Sistan and Baluchestan Province
Qasemabad, Bampur, a village in Bampur County
Qasemabad, Chabahar, a village in Chabahar County
Qasemabad-e Gonbad, a village in Dalgan County

South Khorasan Province
Qasemabad, Darmian, a village in Darmian County

Tehran Province
Qasemabad, Pishva, village in Pishva County
Ghasemabad, a quarter of Eslamshahr city
Qasemabad-e Akhavan, village in Varamin County
Qasemabad-e Eskander Beyk, village in Varamin County
Qasemabad-e Qanat Shur, village in Rey County
Qasemabad-e Shurabad, village in Rey County
Qasemabad-e Tehranchi, village in Rey County
Qaleh-ye Qasemabad, village in Varamin County

Yazd Province
Qasemabad, Khatam, a village in Khatam County

Zanjan Province
Qasemabad, Zanjan, a village in Mahneshan County

Pakistan
Qasimabad, Hyderabad, a town in Hyderabad, Sindh, Pakistan
Qasimabad Taluka, administrative subdivision (taluka) of Hyderabad District
Qasimabad, Karachi, a neighbourhood in Karachi, Sindh, Pakistan
Qasimabad, Punjab in Sahiwal District, Punjab, Pakistan

See also
Kazemabad (disambiguation), a different name also referring to several places
Kalateh-ye Qasemabad (disambiguation)